Please don't delete this article because this actor or actress is new and will play/is playing a lead, supporting or breakthrough role in the tokusatsu series "Kaitou Sentai Lupinranger VS Keisatsu Sentai Patranger" and will continue their career and make more roles, either lead or supporting, after the end of the programme.

Ike Nwala is a Nigerian American comedian, actor and narrator based in Tokyo, Japan. He was born on June 5, 1986, in Manhattan, New York and was raised in Seattle, Washington. Nwala is a member of the comedy group Chō Shinjuku and is represented by Watanabe Entertainment.

Biography
While in college as a Japanese video shop worker in Chinatown–International District, Seattle, he was shocked by Junji Takada's early morning bazooka corner of the comedy programme Tensai Takeshi no Genki ga Deru TV!!, which became a big opportunity to seek as a comedian. When he saw "Muneo Kurii" and "Yabao Gesu" played by Hironari Yamazaki in Richard Hall, he could not understand what the dialogue, but felt it was "comical and funny!", and his interest in comedy increased. After being recommended by a clerk, he continued to watch Japanese comedians and their shows, such as Junji Takada, Untouchable, Ogiyahagi, Ninety-nine, Downtown, Cream Stew, etc. After having graduated from university with a dream of becoming a comedian in Japan one week after coming to the country, he started living in Hirano-ku, Osaka and studied Japanese and the Kansai dialect by way of self-teaching through watching more programs.

Five years after he came to Japan, he participated in the audition of Chō Shinjuku atthe recommendation of actor Gota Watabe. Nwala joined Chō Shinjuku, on September 29, 2011.

Personal life
Computers have been a hobby of Nwala's since he was 9. When he was 18, he entered a private institute of technology in Washington to learn about information technology and technician relations. He grade skipped for two years and graduated at the age of 20. After that, he worked as a data centre engineer at Goldman Sachs, a major foreign-owned securities company.

Actor Gota Watabe and singer Nana Tanimura are two of his good friends. Nwala is also close to singer Tomohisa Yamashita, who he says that is "a really friendly creature."

On September 10, 2020, Nwala tested positive for COVID-19.

Artistic Style

Chō Shinjuku
He has many blurs trying to conform to Japanese culture. Member Tiger Fukuda dubbed American jokes into the neta. Sometimes he imitates Dante Carver, Usain Bolt, Tiger Woods, etc. Along with Koala Koarashi and the two of them also have a combi-activity with the name Nuwarashi.

Nuwarashi
As a representative example, he is the one that made Nankin Tamasudare American style. He heavily uses "Oh!", "Yeah!", and "Come on!" in the stories. Koala Koarashi makes the neta. In addition, there was a rhythm net "Pocochin drum" that shows vocal percussion by hitting the crotch, which was exhibited at Tokyo Broadcasting System Television's Arita Children, which recorded sixth place in the Yahoo search word and collected topics.

Pin activities
He performed as a bilingual MC of popular programme Oha Suta.

In 5-Ji ni muchū, he was in charge as Kurofune correspondent every Wednesday. He is a cheerful character like Eddie Murphy and it turns back on the pretend of Ryo Fukawa with American jokes and lower neta.

He has a monologue story called "announcement at the entrance of Tokyo DisneySea", and it became a topic on Twitter and so on at the moment on the fact that this was broadcast at the 21st "Komakasugite Tsutawaranai Monomane Senshuken".

He was ranked in the 2016 half-year TV programme ranking "break tarento" department tenth place, attracting attention.

After that, the number of his appearance programmes had steadily increased, the number of his appearance program was 13 in the previous year, which increased to 175 and ranked in the sixth-place of the break-thread division of 2016.

Publications

Newspapers
The Japan Times (29 Nov 2017) "The consummation of cool is a funny business for comedian Ike Nwala".

Magazines
Shūkan Taishū (Shūkan Taishū 16 Oct 2017 issue) "Ike Nwala 'America Hitotoshite Saikyō no Entertainer ni' Warawaseru Ningen Chikara".

Discography

Participation work

Films
Yo-kai Watch: Soratobu Kujira to Double no Sekai no Daibōken da Nyan! (2016) guest appearance in live-action part (as himself)
Yo-kai Watch Shadowside: Oni-ō no Fukkatsu (2017) guest appearance (as eyeglass brother)

Dramas
Kaitou Sentai Lupinranger VS Keisatsu Sentai Patranger (ABC, 11 Feb 2018 – 10 Feb 2019) – as Director Hilltop

Appearing programmes

Television

Current regular programmes
Oha Suta (TX, 6 Apr 2016 –) (pin) Bilingual MC from weekdays
5-Ji ni Muchū! (Tokyo MX, 6 Apr 2016 –) (pin) Every Wednesday

Former regular programmes
 Regular
Moshi Moshi Nippon TV (NHK G, 31 Jul – 12 Nov 2015, BS Fuji, NHK World) (pin)
Nep & Imoto no Sekai Banzuke (NTV, 13 Nov 2015 – 11 Mar 2016) (pin)

 Quasi-regular
Eigo de Asobo (NHK E) (pin) Occasional appearances

Former appearances

 HBO
Vice News Tonight (3 May 2017) (pin)

 TV Tokyo
Konya mo Doru Bako (25 Aug 2015) (Nuwarashi)
Kore Kangaeta Hito, Tensai ja ne!? –Sekai no Benri Goods Atsumemashita Special– (27 Nov 2015, 11 Jan 2016) (pin)
Goddotan (20 Aug 2016) (pin)
Nichiyou Chaplin (5 Nov, 24 Dec 2017) (Chō Shinjuku)

 Nippon TV
24-Jikan TV "Ai wa Chikyū o Sukuu" (31 Aug 2014/23 Aug 2015) (Chō Shinjuku) 37 Ai wa Chikyū o Sukuu
Ariyoshi no Kabe (3 Aug/28 Dec 2015) (pin)
Downtown no Gaki no Tsukai ya Arahende!! (9 Aug 2015) (pin)
Monomane Grand Prix (22 Sep 2015) (pin)
Uchi no Gaya ga sumimasen! (13 Dec 2015) (pin)
Geinin Hōdō (28 Dec 2015) (Chō Shinjuku)
Sukkiri! (5 Jan 2016) (Nuwarashi)
Kyūkyoku no ￮× Quiz Show!! Chō Toi! Shinjitsu ka? Uso ka? (2 Jun 2017) (Nuwarashi)
Uwasa no Neta (21 Jun 2017) (pin)
Intelli ga Shiranai Sekai no o Baka Gimon (26 Aug 2017) (pin)
School Kakumei! (5 Nov 2017) (pin)

 Fuji Television
Tonneruzu no Minasan no Okage deshita (2 Apr 2015/22 Dec 2012) Hakase to joshu –Komakasugite Tsutawaranai Monomane Senshuken– (pin)
Sakigake! Ongaku no Jikan (15 Nov 2015/17/24 Jan/6 Mar 2016) (pin)
Proyagu Chin Play Kō Play Taishō (5 Nov 2016) (pin)
Nep League (12 Dec 2016/27 Mar/17 Apr 2017) (pin)
Love music (6/13 Aug 2017) (pin)
Ninki Geinōjin ni Itazura! Gyōten Happening * Renpatsu (5 Oct 2017) (pin)

 Tokyo MX
Barairo Dandy (16 Sep 2016) (pin)

 TV Asahi
'Pu' Suma (27 Mar 2015) (Nuwarashi)
Nihonjin no 3-wari shika Shiranai koto Cream Stew no Hana Taka! Yūetsu-kan (19 Jul/30 Aug/4 Oct 2015) (pin)
Nanikore Chinhyakkei (9 Dec 2015/14 Dec 2016) (pin)
Buramayo to yu kaina Nakama-tachi Atsu Atsu'! (27 Feb/5 Mar 2016) (pin)
Kikinikui Koto o Kiku (8 Jun/24 Aug 2016) (pin)
Morning Show (7 Jul 2016) (pin)
Onegai! Ranking (31 Aug/14/28 Sep 2016) (pin)
Ametalk (10 Aug/14 Sep 2017) (pin)
Cream VS Osamu Hayashi! Quiz Survivor (31 Dec 2017) (pin)
Sekai wa tatta 6-ri de tsunagaru (4 Jan 2018) (pin)

 Tokyo Broadcasting System Television
Arita Children (16 Jun 2015) (Nuwarashi)
Geinin Cannonball (1 Jan 2016) (pin)
Kyūkyoku Battle "Zeus" III (24 Nov 2016) (pin)
Suiyōbi no Downtown (21 Jun 2017) (pin)
Nakai-kun no Manabu Switch (30 Oct 2017) (pin)

 BS-CS broadcast
Gekirea Chinhyakkei (5 Jul/1 Nov, CS TereAsa Channel 1) (pin)
Gyara 3000-en Geinin (10 Aug 2015, BS Sky PerfecTV!) (pin)
Nogizaka46 Eigo (10 Dec 2016, CS TBS Channel) (pin)

 Sky PerfecTV!
Dream Series Geinin All Star Champion Bowling 2018 (30 Jan 2018) (pin)

 Iwate Asahi Television/Akita Asahi Broadcasting
Katte ni Kankō Taishi (7 Nov 2015) (pin)

 Chubu-Nippon Broadcasting
Owarai Wide Show Marco Polori! (1 May 2016) (Nuwarashi)
mu-Jack (21 Apr 2017) (Nuwarashi)

 Mainichi Broadcasting System
Banana BuraMayo no Atarashī Hōritsu o Tsukuru Kai (28 Feb 2017) (pin)

 Space Shower TV
Mogi Mogi Kana-Boon (4 Feb 2016, 11/18/25 Jun 2017) (pin)

Voice acting

Current regular programmes
Love music (CX, 16 Oct 2015 –) Narration charge; Every Sunday

Former appearances
The Big Chance! (29 Dec 2014/3 Aug 2015) Narration
Countdown Anime Heroine (29 Dec 2014, NHK Radio) Narration
Yachimata TV (12 Apr 2017) Narration
Zettai! Kazlazer (19 Apr 2017) Narration
Mission "Hawaii-shima no Zaihō o Sagase!" (30 Sep 2017, NHK E) Narration; as Boss
VS Arashi (12 Oct 2017) Narration; In the corner "Quiz Jun Matsumoto"

Radio
Lotti no Dame Dame Radio Tenshi no Okotoba (17 Ayg 2013, NHK Radio) (Nuwarashi)
Radipedia (14 Apr 2014, J-Wave) (Chō Shinjuku)
CRK Music H.E.A.D.S. (21 Feb 2015, Radio Kansai) (Chō Shinjuku)
Alco & Peace no All Night Nippon 0 (27 Aug 2015, NBS) (pin)
Mana Sakura-Hollywood Koshisho no Asamade Maruhadaka (30 Jul/6 Aug 2016, NCB) (pin)
Gold Rush (13 Jan 2017, J-Wave) (pin)
Avalon (23 May 2017, J-Wave) (pin)
Sanshirō no All Night Nippon 0 (24 Dec 2017, NBS) –Radio Charity Musicthon Special– (pin)

Webcasts

Former appearances
Wata@Ame! (Ameba Fresh! Studio, 28 Sep 2015) (Chō Shinjuku)
Maasa no Heya e yōkoso (NotTV, 21/28 Nov 2015) (Nuwarashi)
Dōga Hakkutsu! Gao Gao Gyao! (GyaO, webcast period 9 Nov 2016 – 14 Jan 2017) (Nuwarashi) Part 1/2/3/4
Sakidori Bose (GyaO, 19 Dec 2016 – 30 Jan 2017) (pin) every Monday
Daimaou Kosaka no Katsuage (Abema TV, 27 Dec 2016) (pin)
The Night (AbemaTV, 11/18 Mar 2017) (pin)
([木内晶子] In 1997, she applied to the "1st The Japan Audition" by a classmate's recommendation while studying at Kagawa Prefecture Takamatsu West High School. She passed the actor division from 190,000 people and entered the entertainment industry. The following year, she debuted as a heroine role at TBS series Pu-Pu-Pu- where V6's Coming Century starred.

Stage

Personal live
Ike Nwala no Comedy Challenge
Vol.1 (4 Jun 2016) Guests: Miracle Hikaru, Saraba Seishun no Hikari's Tetsuya Morita, New York's Hiromasa Yashiki. VTR Navigator: Ogiyahagi's Ken Yahagi
Vol.2 (5 Mar 2017) Guests: Jun Miho, Shizzle's Jun Murakami, Zigzag Ziggy's Masaru Ikeda. VTR Navigator: Drunk Dragon's Taku Suzuki

Guest appearances
Chidori no Dai Manzai (Surprise Guest appearance on a single live of Chidori)
Tokyo Yomiuri Hall (5 Nov 2017)
Osaka Shin Kabukiza (10 Nov 2017)

Events
8 May 2016 "Dynamite Kansai 2016 –Open Tournament Zenyasai–" (Lumine the Yoshimoto) (pin)
21 Aug 2016 "Rocketman Summer Fes' 2016 thank you for the music!" (Tokyo Ebisu The Garden Hall) (pin)

Advertising

Television
DMM Eikaiwa TVCM (2014) Co-starred with Ogiyahagi's Ken Yahagi as a teacher on a YouTube ad (2015)
Puzzle Wonderland TVCM (2015) (pin)
DMM Eikaiwa TVCM (2017)

Internet
Sanko-Seika (5 Oct 2015) web limited video, new product Nōkō Cheese Kibun as Rich Cheese Man (pin)
West Gigantic City Land '17 official adverts
Waiting Room (26 Jun 2017) (pin)
Interview (30 Jun 2017) (pin)
Shadow Boxing (7 Jul 2017) (pin)
Ticket (20 Jul 2017) (pin)

References

External links
 
 
 
 
 

Expatriate television personalities in Japan
21st-century American comedians
Japanese comedians
American male comedians
Japanese people of African-American descent
American expatriates in Japan
African-American male comedians
People from Manhattan
People from Seattle
Living people
American people of Nigerian descent
Japanese people of Nigerian descent
Year of birth missing (living people)
21st-century African-American people